Edward Hubberd (died 1602), of Birchanger and Stansted Mountfitchet, Essex, was an English politician.

He was a Member (MP) of the Parliament of England for Monmouth Boroughs in 1593 and for Lancaster in 1597.

References

16th-century births
1602 deaths
People from Uttlesford (district)
English MPs 1593
English MPs 1597–1598
People from Stansted Mountfitchet